Blythe is a feminine given name from an Old English. surname with the same spelling meaning "cheerful", "joyous", "pleasant", dating further back from the Proto-Germanic word blithiz, meaning "gentle", "kind". Variants of the name include Blighe, Bligh, Blight, Blyth, Blith, Blithe and Blygh.

Notable people with the name include:
Blythe Auffarth (born 1985), American actress
Drew Blythe Barrymore, American actress
Blythe Daley or Blyth Daly (1901–1965), British-born American actress 
Blythe Danner (born 1943), American actress
Blythe Duff (born 1962), Scottish actress
 Anndrew Blythe Gorostiza, the real name of Andrea Brillantes (born 2003), Filipino actress
Blythe Hartley (born 1982), Canadian Olympic diver
Blythe Loutit (1940–2005), founder member of the Save the Rhino Trust, artist and conservationist
Blythe McGarvie, American business executive
Blythe Metz (born 1977), American actress
Blythe Wilson, Canadian actress

Fictional characters 
Blythe, a supporting character in Netflix series You
Blythe Baxter, the main protagonist of the cartoon show Littlest Pet Shop

References

Feminine given names